The men's 400 metres was an event at the 1976 Summer Olympics in Montreal. The competition was held on July 26, 1976, July 28, 1976, and on July 29, 1976. Forty-four athletes from 29 nations competed. The maximum number of athletes per nation had been set at 3 since the 1930 Olympic Congress. The event was won by Alberto Juantorena of Cuba, the nation's first medal in the event, breaking a string of five victories by the United States. Juantorena became the first man to win both the 800 metres and 400 metres in an Olympics.

Summary

In the final, Fred Newhouse and Maxie Parks appeared to go for the early lead, while Alberto Juantorena was initially a little slower. Then he stretched out on the backstretch to regain position about equal to the third American Herman Frazier. Coming off the final turn Juantorena had caught the rest of the field and was a step behind Newhouse. Parks and Fons Brijdenbach were about even two more strides back with Frazier just behind them. As Juantorena began to pass Newhouse, Newhouse noticeably struggled, leaving Juantorena with the gold medal. Three metres back, Frazier just edged ahead of Brijdenbach for the bronze medal, as Parks faded.

Background

This was the eighteenth appearance of the event, which is one of 12 athletics events to have been held at every Summer Olympics. Two finalists, but no medalists, from 1972 returned: sixth-place finisher Markku Kukkoaho of Finland and seventh-place Karl Honz of West Germany. Alberto Juantorena was the favorite, ranked #1 in the world and trying to become the first man to win the 400 metres/800 metres double (outside of the 1906 Intercalated Games). His main competition was the United States team, aiming for a sixth consecutive win in the event.

Antigua and Barbuda, Belize, the Netherlands Antilles, and Papua New Guinea appeared in this event for the first time. The United States made its eighteenth appearance in the event, the only nation to compete in it at every Olympic Games to that point.

Competition format

The competition retained the basic four-round format from 1920. The "fastest loser" system, introduced in 1964, was applied in the first round. With 20 fewer runners than in 1972 (44 compared to 64), there were only 6 first-round heats, each scheduled to have 7 or 8 athletes but one with only 6 starters. The top five runners in each heat advanced to the quarterfinals along with the next two fastest overall. The 4 quarterfinals each had 8 runners; the top four athletes in each quarterfinal heat advanced to the semifinals, with no "fastest loser" spots. The semifinals featured 2 heats of 8 runners each. The top four runners in each semifinal heat advanced, making an eight-man final.

Records

These were the standing world and Olympic records (in seconds) prior to the 1976 Summer Olympics.

No world or Olympic records were set during this event.

Schedule

The quarterfinals were moved back up to the first day (along with the first round) for the first time since 1964.

All times are Eastern Daylight Time (UTC-4)

Results

Heats

The heats were held on July 26, 1976.

Heat 1

Heat 2

Heat 3

Heat 4

Heat 5

Heat 6

Quarterfinals

The quarterfinals were held on July 26, 1976.

Quarterfinal 1

Quarterfinal 2

Quarterfinal 3

Quarterfinal 4

Semifinals

The semifinals were held on July 28, 1976.

Semifinal 1

Semifinal 2

Final

The final was held on July 29, 1976.

References

 1
400 metres at the Olympics
Men's events at the 1976 Summer Olympics